Robert Piotrowski (born 1963) is an architect. He leads Ecker Architekten, an Architecture and Interior Design practice based in Buchen, Germany. Piotrowski's projects include the Corporate Headquarters for Holly Hunt, LTD in Chicago, the town halls in Seckach and in Rosenberg, a community center in Zimmern, the Sparkasse in Hettingen, and The House Dandelion Clock, a kindergarten for physically and mentally handicapped children in Buchen.

Biography
Piotrowski was born in Buffalo, NY, United States. He earned a Bachelor of Science in Architecture from the State University of New York at Buffalo in 1984 and a Master of Architecture from the Harvard University Graduate School of Design in 1988. In 1987, he studied at the ETH Zürich – the Swiss Federal University of Technical Studies in Zürich, Switzerland. Prior to founding Ecker Architekten with his partner, Dea Ecker, Piotrowski worked with Powell/Kleinschmidt, Holabird and Root, and Krueck + Sexton in Chicago.

Awards, honors, publications and positions
The work of Robert Piotrowski has been exhibited at the Chicago Athenaeum, The Chicago Architectural Club, and in a traveling exhibit of Beispielhaftes Bauen from the Architectural Association of the State of Baden-Württemberg, Germany. Executed projects have been featured in publications such as Detail, Informationdienst Holz, Glas, [ark], and AIT (Germany), PUU – wood/holz/bois (Finland), Interni (Russia), and Progressive Architecture, Interiors, and Interior Design Magazine in the United States. He has received high honors for his work, including the CCAIA Honor Award for the Chicago-Kent College of Law in 1992  and for the Galter Health Sciences Library at Northwestern University in 1997, the honor of Beispielhaftes Bauen for the Community Center in Zimmern and the Kindergarten Dandelion Clock in 2007, and the  award of Gute Bauten from the Bund Deutscher Architekten for the Town Hall in Seckach and the Community Center in Zimmern in 2008. Ecker Architekten is a nominee for the Hugo Häring Preis in 2009   In a recent hardware design competition sponsored by Colombo Design s.p.a., their entry was one of 16 finalists among 6209 entries from 103 countries 

Piotrowski has taught architecture as an adjunct associate professor at the College of Architecture at the Illinois Institute of Technology from 1996 to 2000. He was the Droste Visiting Lecturer for the IIT Paris Program in 2003, and assisted students in an IIT design-build studio in the summer of 2009. He has been a guest critic at various schools of architecture including the Massachusetts Institute of Technology, The University of Illinois at Chicago, the University of Wisconsin–Milwaukee and the University of Southern California in Los Angeles.

References

Publications
Bank Building - March 2012
Play Indoor & Outdoor - 2011
Closer to God: Religious Architecture and Sacred Spaces - September 2010
Kindergartens - Educational Spaces - 2010
Architektur in Baden-Württemberg - 2009
Interni - January 2009
Glas - January 2009
PUU- Wood/Holz/Bois - January 2009
Informationdienst Holz - December 2008
ark - October 2008
Interni - August 2008
Scala 2015 - May 2008
Detail- Konzept/Kindergartens - March 2008
Architektur neues Baden-Württemberg - 2007
Influence Across Fields - The Chicago Architectural Club Journal 10 - 2002
Positions in Architecture - The Chicago Architectural Club Journal 9 - 2001

External links
Harvard University Graduate School of Design
ETH Zürich - Swiss Federal University of Technical Studies in Zürich
State University of New York at Buffalo School of Architecture and Planning
Illinois Institute of Technology College of Architecture
Massachusetts Institute of Technology (MIT) School of Architecture
Ecker Architekten
American Institute of Architects, Chicago Chapter
BDIA - Bund Deutscher Innenarchitekten
Architektenkammer Baden-Württemberg
Baunetzwissen
Beton.org
Mimoa

Artists from Chicago
American expatriates in Germany
American architects
Harvard Graduate School of Design alumni
Illinois Institute of Technology faculty
American interior designers
Architects from Buffalo, New York
University at Buffalo alumni
1963 births
Living people